Edward Salomon (August 11, 1828April 21, 1909) was a Jewish American politician and the 8th Governor of Wisconsin, having ascended to office from the Lieutenant Governorship after the accidental drowning of his predecessor, Louis P. Harvey.  He was the first Jewish Governor of Wisconsin.

Early life
Salomon was born in Ströbeck, in the Province of Saxony, in what was then the Kingdom of Prussia. He was the son of Dorothea (Klussman) and Christoph Salomon. He attended the University of Berlin, but as a revolutionary sympathizer, fled the country in 1849. He immigrated to the United States and settled in Manitowoc, Wisconsin, where he was a school teacher, a surveyor, and served as deputy circuit court clerk. In 1852 he moved to Milwaukee, where he read law, was admitted to the bar in 1855, and set up a law practice with Winfield Smith.  Salomon was Jewish and a cousin of Edward S. Salomon, the future Governor of the Washington Territory who was considered to be one of the highest ranking Jewish heroes in the American Civil War.

Career
In 1860, Salomon changed from his Democratic party affiliations to support Abraham Lincoln for the presidency, and in 1861 was nominated by the Republican Party on their Union Party ticket as candidate for Lieutenant Governor.  He ultimately won the election by a narrow margin. In 1862, when Governor Lewis P. Harvey drowned, Salomon became Wisconsin's first German-born and Jewish governor.

In 1862 Governor Salomon responded to a request from the War Department for more troops by asking for volunteers and setting up a draft. He was able to raise 14 regiments. Salomon had to call up federal troops to quell the Port Washington Draft Riot. Suppression of the rioters with use of federal troops cost him the 1864 Republican nomination.

Salomon's brothers, Frederick Salomon and Charles Eberhard Salomon, served as officers in the Union Army.  On July 18, 1862, Frederick was appointed by President Abraham Lincoln as a brigadier general of volunteers to rank from July 16, 1862. President Lincoln submitted the nomination to the U.S. Senate on May 17, 1862 and the Senate confirmed the appointment on July 16, 1862. Charles served as colonel of the 5th Missouri Volunteer Infantry (3 months, 1861) and on September 26, 1862 rejoined the army and succeeded Frederick as colonel of the 9th Wisconsin Volunteer Infantry Regiment. On March 13, 1865, his cousin Edward S. Salomon was made a brigadier general for his “distinguished gallantry and meritorious service.” On January 13, 1866, President Andrew Johnson nominated Charles Eberhard Salomon for appointment to the grade of brevet brigadier general of volunteers to rank from March 13, 1865, and the Senate confirmed the appointment on March 12, 1866.

In 1864, Salomon resumed his law practice in Milwaukee. In 1869 he moved to New York City, where he continued his law practice for a number of years as legal representative for various important German interests. When he retired in 1894, he returned to Germany and lived there until his death.

Death
Salomon died April 21, 1909 in Germany at Frankfurt am Main. He was buried at Frankfurt's Alter Jüdischer Friedhof ("Old Jewish Cemetery").

Family life
Salomon married a woman named Elise Nebel. He had three brothers, Charles Eberhard Salomon, Frederich Salomon, and Herman Salomon who were involved in the American Civil War.

See also 
 Prussia in the American Civil War
 List of U.S. state governors born outside the United States

References

External links
Salomon, Gov. Edward (1828-1909) | Wisconsin Historical Society

1828 births
1909 deaths
German emigrants to the United States
German-American Forty-Eighters
19th-century German Jews
Republican Party governors of Wisconsin
Jewish American state governors of the United States
Lieutenant Governors of Wisconsin
People from Halberstadt
People from the Province of Saxony
Politicians from Milwaukee
People of Wisconsin in the American Civil War
Wisconsin lawyers
Union (American Civil War) state governors
Jewish American people in Wisconsin politics